Pyrrole-2-carboxylate monooxygenase (pyrrole-2-carboxylate oxygenase) is an enzyme with systematic name pyrrole-2-carboxylate,NADH:oxygen oxidoreductase (5-hydroxylating). This enzyme catalyses the following chemical reaction

 pyrrole-2-carboxylate + NADH + H+ + O2  5-hydroxypyrrole-2-carboxylate + NAD+ + H2O

Pyrrole-2-carboxylate monooxygenase is a flavoprotein (FAD).

References

External links 
 

EC 1.14.13